The Nigeria Open, also called ITTF Challenge Nigeria Series or ITTF Challenge Seamester Nigeria Open is an annual table tennis tournament in Lagos, Nigeria, run by the International Table Tennis Federation as part of Challenge Series. Egyptian Omar Assar has won the most single gold medals. In 2018, the prize money for the medalist at the event was $46,000. The maiden edition was known as Lagos Classics, it was until 2014 that the tournament was listed in ITTF calendar.

Tournament winners

Individual events

References 

Table tennis competitions
ITTF Challenge Series
Recurring sporting events established in 2013
ITTF World Tour
Table tennis competitions in Nigeria
2013 establishments in Nigeria